The Bowling Green Barons were a baseball team that represented Bowling Green, Kentucky in the Class D Kentucky-Illinois-Tennessee (Kitty) League from 1939 to 1942. The franchise was purchased from the Lexington (TN) Bees during the off-season. The Barons were owned by a group of local investors led by Vick Smith Sr. (His son Vick Jr. was reserve outfielder for the club in 1939.) Their home field was Fairgrounds Park.

With a roster consisting largely of players from the 1938 Lexington team, the Barons (75-51) finished in a second-place tie with the Owensboro (KY) Oilers in 1939. They were managed by Innes "Rip" Fanning, another Lexington holdover. With a three-game sweep against Owensboro, they advanced to the finals of the postseason Shaughnessy playoffs against the first-place Mayfield (KY) Browns. The series was tied at two games apiece when Fanning, seeking reassurances that he would be rehired the next season and receiving none, resigned on September 14. Kitty League veteran and former major leaguer Herbert "Dutch" Welch took over the reins and led Bowling Green to the Shaughnessy title four games to two.

External links
Baseball Reference
Kittyleague.com
Remembering the Barons

This article is based on the "Bowling Green Barons" article at Baseball-Reference.com Bullpen. The Bullpen is a wiki, and its content is available under the GNU Free Documentation License.

Sports in Bowling Green, Kentucky
Defunct baseball teams in Kentucky
Defunct minor league baseball teams
Kentucky-Illinois-Tennessee League
Brooklyn Dodgers minor league affiliates
Baseball teams established in 1939
Baseball teams disestablished in 1942
Professional baseball teams in Kentucky
1939 establishments in Kentucky
1942 disestablishments in Kentucky
Kentucky-Illinois-Tennessee League teams